SS Dolly Madison was a Liberty ship built in the United States during World War II. She was named after Dolley Madison, the wife of James Madison, President of the United States from 1809 to 1817.

Construction
Dolly Madison was laid down on 20 May 1943, under a Maritime Commission (MARCOM) contract, MC hull 1530, by J.A. Jones Construction, Panama City, Florida; she was launched on 27 September 1943.

History
She was allocated to Merchant & Miners Transportation Co., on 14 October 1943. On 16 May 1946, she was laid up in the National Defense Reserve Fleet, in the James River Group, Lee Hall, Virginia. On 15 April 1947, she was sold for commercial use and went through several owners.

References

Bibliography

 
 
 
 

 

Liberty ships
Ships built in Panama City, Florida
1943 ships
James River Reserve Fleet
Maritime incidents in 1964